Protomocerus is a genus of longhorn beetles of the subfamily Lamiinae, containing the following species:

 Protomocerus gregorii Gahan, 1898
 Protomocerus pulcher (Péringuey, 1892)

References

Prosopocerini